

Mys Shmidta Airport , also known as Cape Shmidt Airport, is a former military airbase in the Iultinsky District of Chukotka, Russia.
It is a major airfield with a  concrete tarmac. It was built in 1954 as an Arctic staging base for intercontinental bomber flights, with caretaker services provided by OGA (Arctic Control Group). The gravel overrun suggests that the runway was to eventually be extended to 3000 m. Unlike airports such as the Provideniya Bay Airport, which has always been a civilian airport, or the Iultin Airport, which was constructed specifically to serve the needs of the remote mine nearby, the Mys Shmidta airport was initially part of the ring of forward staging bases used by the Arctic Control Group (OGA) prior to intercontinental ballistic missiles gaining favour as the primary means of long-range defense.

Airlines and Destinations

Gallery

See also
 Chekurovka, abandoned Arctic staging base
 Ostrov Bolshevik, abandoned Arctic staging base
 Tiksi North, abandoned Arctic staging base
 Tiksi West, abandoned Arctic staging base
 Dresba, abandoned Arctic staging base

References

External links
 Visit to the area
 

Airports in the Arctic
Russian Air Force bases
Airports built in the Soviet Union
Airports in Chukotka Autonomous Okrug
Chukchi Sea
Populated places of Arctic Russia

Soviet Long Range Aviation Arctic staging bases